United Nations Security Council resolution 812, adopted unanimously on 12 March 1993, after expressing its alarm at the humanitarian situation in Rwanda due to the ongoing civil war, in particular the number of refugees and displaced persons which posed an international threat to peace and security, the Council called upon the Government of Rwanda, the National Republican Movement for Democracy and Development, and the Rwandan Patriotic Front to respect a ceasefire that took place on 9 March 1993 and implement other agreements they had committed themselves to. It was the first resolution on the situation in Rwanda.

The resolution invited the Secretary General Boutros Boutros-Ghali to examine possible contributions by the United Nations to strengthen the Organisation of African Unity's (OAU) efforts in Rwanda, including the possible establishment of an international force. It also asked Boutros-Ghali to examine requests by Rwanda and Uganda to deploy observers along their border.

Resolution 812 concluded by asking both Rwandan parties to co-operate with the United Nations and OAU, and to resume their negotiations on 15 March 1993 as agreed, urging both to respect international humanitarian law.

See also
 Arusha Accords
 History of Rwanda
 Juvénal Habyarimana
 List of United Nations Security Council Resolutions 801 to 900 (1993–1994)
 Rwandan Civil War
 United Nations Observer Mission Uganda–Rwanda

References

External links
 
Text of the Resolution at undocs.org

 0812
1993 in Rwanda
Rwandan genocide
 0812
March 1993 events